Persicaria lapathifolia (syn. Polygonum lapathifolium), known as pale persicaria,  is a plant of the family Polygonaceae.  It is closely related to Persicaria maculosa and as such is considered a weed in Britain and Europe. Other common names for the plant include pale smartweed, curlytop knotweed, and willow weed. It is a species complex made up of a great many varying forms, sometimes considered varieties. The environment also has a strong influence on the morphology of an individual plant.

Description
The leaves are alternate with short stalks, often densely hairy underneath. The leaf blades often have a dark-coloured blotch in the centre and are lanceolate or narrowly elliptical and have entire margins. Each leaf base has stipules which are fused into a stem-enclosing sheath that is loose and fringed with few if any hairs at the upper end. The inflorescence is a dense spike, often nodding. The perianth of each tiny pink flower consists of four or five lobes, fused near the base. There are six stamens, two partially fused carpels and two styles. The fruit is a rounded, flattened nut. This plant flowers from July to September in northern temperate regions.

Distribution and habitat
Persicaria lapathifolia is found in many parts of both the Old World and New World. Many varietal and sub-specific names have been coined, as the plant is morphologically variable. The species is found growing on the sea shore and in disturbed ground such as arable land, gardens, waste ground, rubbish tips and road verges.

References

External links
Jepson eFlora
photo of herbarium specimen at Missouri Botanical Garden, collected in Missouri in 1890
Calphotos Photo gallery, University of California

lapathifolia
Flora of North America
Flora of South America
Flora of Asia
Flora of Australia
Flora of Africa
Flora of Europe
Plants described in 1753
Taxa named by Carl Linnaeus